St. Augustine Catholic Church is a parish of the Roman Catholic Church near Clarkson, Kentucky, in the Eastern Deanery of the Diocese of Owensboro. It is noted for its historic parish church at 30 St Augustine Church Road in Grayson Springs. Built in 1854, it was added to the National Register of Historic Places on April 7, 1989.

References

National Register of Historic Places in Grayson County, Kentucky
Churches on the National Register of Historic Places in Kentucky
Roman Catholic churches in Kentucky
Roman Catholic churches completed in 1854
Roman Catholic Diocese of Owensboro
1854 establishments in Kentucky
19th-century Roman Catholic church buildings in the United States
Greek Revival architecture in Kentucky
Gothic Revival church buildings in Kentucky